Omega I or Omega 1 is a sector in south-western Greater Noida, Uttar Pradesh, India, mostly known for serving the Greenwoods gated society. Bordered by Omega II to the north and Phi I, Phi II and Chi III to the south, it also serves the head office of Yamuna Expressway Industrial Development Authority (YEIDA). It is named after the Greek letter Omega.

External links 
 OneMap Greater Noida

References 

Geography of Uttar Pradesh